Emilie Nussear Connors (born November 9, 1982 in Clearwater, Florida) is an American former competitive ice dancer. She had the most success with partner Brandon Forsyth, with whom she is the 2000 World Junior silver medalist. They were coached by Bob Young in Simsbury, Connecticut.

In January 2002, Nussear tried out with Mathew Gates on the advice of her coach, Tatiana Tarasova. Nussear/Gates won the silver medal at the 2002 Karl Schäfer Memorial and placed 5th at the 2003 U.S. Championships. They were coached by Tarasova, Nikolai Morozov, and Maia Usova in Newington, Connecticut.

As of 2016, she is a coach at the International Skating Center of Connecticut in Simsbury.

She is married to sports journalist Kevin Connors of ESPN.

Programs 
(with Gates)

Results 
GP: Grand Prix; JGP: Junior Grand Prix

With Forsyth

With Gates

References

External links
 
 Ice Dance.com profile

American female ice dancers
1982 births
Living people
World Junior Figure Skating Championships medalists
21st-century American women